Bob Bjornerud (born September 8, 1945) is a Canadian provincial politician. He was the member of the Legislative Assembly of Saskatchewan for the constituency of Melville-Saltcoats from 1995 to 2016, first as a member of the Liberal Party and later as a member of the Saskatchewan Party. Bjornerud served as the Minister of Agriculture from 2007 to 2012, when he requested not to be considered for a cabinet post in the next cabinet shuffle. Bjornerud did not seek re-election in the 2016 Saskatchewan general election.

Election results

Cabinet positions

References

External links
Members, Legislative Assembly of Saskatchewan
Brief biography

Living people
Farmers from Saskatchewan
Canadian people of Norwegian descent
Saskatchewan Liberal Party MLAs
Saskatchewan Party MLAs
1945 births
Members of the Executive Council of Saskatchewan
21st-century Canadian politicians
People from Kelvington, Saskatchewan